Ram Vilas Paswan (5 July 19468 October 2020) was an Indian politician from Bihar and the Cabinet Minister of Consumer Affairs, Food and Public Distribution in the first and second Modi ministries. Paswan was also the president of the Lok Janshakti Party, nine-times Lok Sabha member and two-time Rajya Sabha MP. He started his political career as member of Samyukta Socialist Party and was elected to the Bihar Legislative Assembly in 1969. Later, Paswan joined Lok Dal upon its formation in 1974, and became its general secretary. He opposed the emergency, and was arrested during this period. He first entered the Lok Sabha in 1977, as a Janata Party member from Hajipur constituency, and was elected again in 1980, 1989, 1991 (from Rosera), 1996, 1998, 1999, 2004 and 2014.

In 2000, Paswan formed the Lok Janshakti Party (LJP) as its president. Subsequently, in 2004, he joined the ruling United Progressive Alliance government and remained a Union Minister in Ministry of Chemicals and Fertilizers and Ministry of Steel. He was posthumously awarded India's third highest civilian award the Padma Bhushan in 2021.

He was known for holding cabinet positions under 7 governments. He was known as the weatherman of Indian politics.

Early life and education
Paswan was born in a Dusadh a Dalit family on 5 July 1946 in Shaharbanni, Khagaria district of Bihar to Jamun Paswan and Siya Devi. Paswan held Bachelor of Laws and Master of Arts degrees from Kosi College, Khagaria and Patna University. He had been selected as a DSP in Bihar Police in 1969.

Political career

Paswan was elected to the Bihar state legislative assembly in 1969 as a member of the Samyukta Socialist Party ("United Socialist Party") from Alauli, a reserved constituency. He lost 1972 Vidhan Sabha election from Alauli to Shri Mishri Sada of Congress. In 1974, as an ardent follower of Raj Narain and Jayaprakash Narayan Paswan became the general secretary of the Lok Dal. He was personally close to the prominent leaders of anti-emergency like Raj Narain, Karpoori Thakur and Satyendra Narayan Sinha.

In 1975, when emergency was proclaimed in India, Paswan was arrested and spent the entire period in jail. On being released in 1977, he became a member of the Janata Party and won election to Parliament for the first time on its ticket from Hajipur with a record margin (later broken) of 424,000 and 89.3% votes which is perhaps an all-time record for General Election in India. Former PM Narasimha Rao got a higher percentage of vote in a 1991 bye-poll. When Janata Party split in 1979, he joined Charan Singh's faction. Paswan was re-elected to the 7th Lok Sabha in 1980 from Hajipur constituency as Janata Party (Socialist) candidate. In 1983, he established the Dalit Sena, an organisation for Dalit emancipation and welfare. The Dalit Sena was later headed by his brother Ram Chandra Paswan. Later it was renamed as Scheduled Caste sena in a vein similar to the Scheduled Caste federation established by Bhim Rao Ambedkar. Paswan lost 1984 Lok Sabha election from Hajipur.

Paswan was elected to the 9th Lok Sabha in 1989 and was appointed Union Minister of Labour and Welfare in the Vishwanath Pratap Singh government. He was elected to Lok Sabha from Rosera (Lok Sabha constituency) in 1991, the only time between 1977 and 2014 when he did not contest from Hajipur. In 1996, he won again from Hajipur, and he even led the ruling alliance or Proposition in the Lok Sabha as the prime minister was a member of the Rajya Sabha. This was also the year when Paswan first became the Union Railway Minister. He continued to hold that post till 1998. Thereafter, Paswan was the Union Communications Minister from October 1999 to September 2001 when he was shifted to the Coal Ministry, the portfolio he held till April 2002.

In 2000, Paswan broke from the Janata Dal, to form the Lok Janshakti Party (LJP). He resigned as minister and left the ruling NDA in 2002 after developing differences with BJP. Following the 2004 Lok Sabha elections, Paswan joined the United Progressive Alliance government and was made the Union Minister in Ministry of Chemicals and Fertilizers and Ministry of Steel.

In the February 2005 Bihar State elections, Paswan's party LJP along with the Indian National Congress contested the election. The result was that no particular party or alliance could form a government by itself. However, Paswan consistently refused to support either Lalu Prasad Yadav, whom he accused of being extremely corrupt, or the right-wing National Democratic Alliance thereby creating a stalemate. This stalemate was broken when Nitish Kumar succeeded in persuading 12 members of Paswan's party to defect; to prevent the formation of a government supported by LJP defectors, the Governor of Bihar, Buta Singh dissolved the state legislature and called for fresh elections, keeping Bihar under President's Rule. In the November 2005 Bihar state elections, Paswan's third-alliance was utterly devastated; the Laloo Yadav-Congress alliance reduced to a minority and the NDA formed the new government.

Paswan has declared that the Bihar state elections have no influence on the Central Government, which will continue with both him and Laloo Yadav as ministers.
Paswan has served as a Union Minister under five different Prime Ministers and continuously held a cabinet berth in all the Council of Ministers formed since 1996 (as of 2015). He was also part of all the national coalitions (the United Front, the National Democratic Alliance and the United Progressive Alliance), which have formed the Indian Government from 1996 to 2015.

For the 2009 Indian general election Paswan forged an alliance with Lalu Prasad Yadav and his Rashtriya Janata Dal, while dumping their erstwhile coalition partner and leader of the United Progressive Alliance, the Indian National Congress from the new alliance. The duo was later joined by Mulayam Singh's Samajwadi Party and were declared the Fourth Front. Paswan lost the elections from Hajipur to the Janata Dal's Ram Sundar Das, a former chief minister of Bihar for the first time in 33 years. His party the Lok Janshakti Party was not able to win any seats in the 15th Lok Sabha, while his coalition partner Yadav and his party too failed to perform well and were reduced to 4 seats.

Paswan was elected as member of 16th Lok Sabha after the 2014 Indian general election from Hajipur constituency when he contested in alliance with BJP, while his son Chirag Paswan won from Jamui constituency also in Bihar.

Paswan was again given charge of the Ministry of Consumer Affairs, Food and Public Distribution in May 2014, which continued in Second Modi ministry in 2019. He was elected to Rajya Sabha in 2019 with the help of BJP though his own party had only 2 MLAs in the state assembly.

Personal life
Paswan married Rajkumari Devi in 1960s. In 2014, he disclosed that he had divorced her in 1981, after his Lok Sabha nomination papers were challenged. Paswan had two daughters from first wife, Usha and Asha. In 1982, he married Reena Sharma, an air hostess. They had a son and a daughter. His son Chirag Kumar Paswan is an actor-turned-politician.

He was often called a dynast. He brought his brothers Pashupati Kumar Paras and Ram Chandra Paswan into politics. Of the six seats that the LJP won in 2019, three were from his family – son Chirag, and brothers Pashupati Kumar Paras and Ram Chandra Paswan. Ram Chandra's son Prince Raj succeeded his father upon his death.

Death 
Paswan died on 8 October 2020, and his death was confirmed by his son, Chirag Paswan. Paswan had undergone heart surgery and was hospitalized for a few weeks prior to his death. Paswan was cremated in Patna on 10 October 2020. His body was brought to Janardan Ghat in the Digha locality from his residence in Shri Krishna Puri, about 3 km away, for the last rites.

See also
List of politicians from Bihar

References

External links
 
 Official biographical sketch in Parliament of India website
 Profile on HindustanTimes.com dated June 2004
 Homepage on Lok Sabha website
 Paswan Profile on TribuneIndia
 Paswan and Indian Muslims
 Union Minister Ram Vilas Paswan passes away

1946 births
2020 deaths
Lok Janshakti Party politicians
V. P. Singh administration
India MPs 1977–1979
India MPs 1980–1984
India MPs 1989–1991
India MPs 1991–1996
India MPs 1996–1997
India MPs 1998–1999
India MPs 1999–2004
India MPs 2004–2009
Rajya Sabha members from Bihar
India MPs 2014–2019
Lok Sabha members from Bihar
People from Khagaria district
Samyukta Socialist Party politicians
Janata Dal politicians
Janata Party politicians
Janata Dal (United) politicians
Members of the Bihar Legislative Assembly
Leaders of the Lok Sabha
Dalit activists
Dalit politicians
Narendra Modi ministry
Bihari politicians
Railway Ministers of India
Labour ministers of India
Steel Ministers of India
Coal Ministers of India
Mining ministers of India
Members of the Cabinet of India